Isoetopsis is a genus of Australian flowering plants in the daisy family.

There is only one known species, Isoetopsis graminifolia, reported from every state in Australia though not from Northern Territory. Grass-cushion is a common name for this species.

The species is listed as threatened in Tasmania.

References

External links
Isoetopsis graminifolia occurrence data from Australasian Virtual Herbarium

Monotypic Asteraceae genera
Astereae
Endemic flora of Australia
Taxa named by Nikolai Turczaninow